Dondestan is the fifth studio album by Robert Wyatt, released in 1991 on Rough Trade Records. The title is a phonetic rendition of the Spanish expression "Donde están", i.e. "Where are they". The cover art is by Wyatt's wife, Alfreda Benge.

Track listing
"Costa" (Robert Wyatt, Alfreda Benge) - 4:39
"The Sight Of The Wind" (Robert Wyatt, Alfreda Benge) – 4:58
"Catholic Architecture" (Robert Wyatt, Alfreda Benge) – 5:10
"Worship" (Robert Wyatt, Alfreda Benge) – 4:50
"Shrinkrap" (Robert Wyatt, Alfreda Benge) – 3:52
"CP Jeebies" (Robert Wyatt) – 4:04
"Left On Man" (Robert Wyatt) – 3:31
"Lisp Service" (Robert Wyatt, music: Hugh Hopper) – 2:10
"N.I.O. (New Information Order)" (Robert Wyatt) – 6:35
"Dondestan" (Robert Wyatt) – 4:49

Dondestan (Revisited)

In 1998, the album was re-released on Hannibal Records with a new mix and track order under the title Dondestan (Revisited).  This was deemed necessary as the original project had gone over budget and had been mixed and released in "an exhausted rush".

Track listing
"CP Jeebies" – 4:04
"N.I.O. (New Information Order)" – 6:37
"Dondestan" – 5:01
"Sight Of The Wind" – 4:57
"Shrinkrap" – 3:51
"Catholic Architecture" – 5:02
"Worship" – 5:52
"Costa (Memories Of Under-Development)" – 4:09
"Left On Man" – 3:31
"Lisp Service" – 2:13

Composers
Robert Wyatt - tracks 1, 2, 3, 9
Robert Wyatt (music) and Alfreda Benge (lyrics) - tracks 4, 5, 6, 7, 8
Hugh Hopper (music) and Robert Wyatt (lyrics) - track 10

References

External links

1991 albums
Robert Wyatt albums
Rough Trade Records albums